Leo Heinrichs, O.F.M. (August 15, 1867 – February 23, 1908) was a Catholic priest of the Franciscan Order. While assigned to St. Elisabeth of Hungary Church in Denver, Colorado, Heinrichs was fatally shot while distributing communion. The shooter, a Sicilian anarchist, later described his motivations as propaganda of the deed and hatred of Catholicism. Heinrichs was later declared a Servant of God, the first step on the path to sainthood.

Biography
Joseph Heinrichs was born on August 15, 1867, in Oestrich, near Erkelenz, Rhineland, Germany.

Under persecution from Otto von Bismarck's Kulturkampf, the Franciscan province of St. Elizabeth of Hungary fled their monastery in Fulda and settled at St. Bonaventure Friary in Paterson, New Jersey. Although still studying in minor seminary, Joseph Heinrichs emigrated to America with them. On December 4, 1886, Heinrichs entered the Franciscan novitiate at St. Bonaventure and received the monastic name Brother Leo. He took his final vows on December 8, 1890, and was ordained to the priesthood on July 26, 1891.

Between 1891 and 1907, Heinrichs served in various positions in the New York and New Jersey area, including the pastor at Holy Angels parish in Singac (Little Falls), New Jersey. In April 1902, a fire devastated much of Croghan, New York. Heinrichs was sent to rebuild the church. The new St. Stephen's church was dedicated on Thanksgiving Day 1903. To pay down the debt, Heinrich solicited donations in lumber camps. In a writes to a friend under the date of January 27, 1904 letter to a friend, he describes his travels:I was away to the woods in order to collect among the lumbermen. I was away four days each time, and two nights I had to sleep with the men in the camps. The poor fellows have to work so hard early and late and have so little comfort. We drove 100 miles the first trip with the thermometer at zero. The second trip 20 miles one day at 40 degrees below. But covered from head to foot in fur, you don’t seem to mind the cold. You have no idea how nice it is to travel through the woods on a clear day when the wind does not disturb the snow. The winter here is the severest that people remember. We had, more or less since the beginning of December, zero to 40 below, and the snowstorms nearly every other day make the roads almost impassable.

Heinrich was then appointed pastor of the parish of St. Bonaventure in Paterson, New Jersey. While at St. Bonaventure, there was an outbreak of smallpox in Patterson, during which Heinrichs spent many hours tending the sick and dying.

Heinrichs was assigned to St. Elizabeth parish in Denver, Colorado, where he arrived on September 23, 1907. As a pastor, Heinrichs would distribute food to the poor every morning at the friary gate. He had received permission to return to Germany to visit his family after an absence of over twenty-one years; but postponed his journey until after June 7, 1908, when he planned to give First Communion to a class of seventy children. A week before his death, he preached at the Young Ladies' Sodality meeting, remarking, “How sweet it is to die at the feet of Mary.”

Death

Heinrichs normally celebrated the 8 AM Sunday Mass, but on Sunday, February 23, 1908, as he had a meeting scheduled that day, he switched with the priest Wulstan Workman to take the 6 AM "Workingmen's Mass. Among attending Mass was fifty-year-old Giuseppe Alia (aka Giuseppe Guaraccio and Angelo Gabriele), an unemployed shoemaker who had recently emigrated from Avola, Sicily. Alia took Communion at altar rail then flung the Host at the priest and drew a revolver. Seeing the gun, the altar boy tried to warn the priest, but Alia opened fire and shot Fr. Heinrichs in the chest. Fr. Heinrichs first attempted to retrieve the fallen Host and collapsed mortally wounded on the step of the Altar of Our Lady, and died minutes later.

Aftermath
While attempting to flee, Alia was tripped by parishioner E.J. Quigley, a conductor for the Denver & Rio Grande Railroad. Off-duty Denver police officer Daniel Crefin (or Cronin) arrested Alia after a brief struggle on the church steps.

At the police station, Alia, who did not speak English, reportedly said through an interpreter, "I went over there because I have a grudge against all priests in general. They are all against the workingman. I went to the communion rail because I could get a better shot. I did not care whether he was a German priest or any other kind of priest... I left Italy three months ago and went first to Central America, and then came to Denver. I am an Anarchist, and I am proud of it. I shot him, and my only regret is that I could not shoot the whole bunch of priests in the church."

In the face of rumored threats of summary justice, Denver law enforcement moved Alia to Colorado Springs for his protection.

Doctor Joseph Cuneo, former Italian consul in Denver, and the then consul Baron Gustavo Tosti, also a physician, testified that they thought Alia insane. 
The prosecution experts said he was not. Alia was convicted of first degree murder and sentenced to be hanged.

Alia never expressed any remorse and made two escape attempts from death row. The first involved the attempted murder of a prison trustee and the second of the prison's deputy warden. In both cases, however, Alia was overpowered by corrections officers soon after leaving his cell. However, Denver police officers expressed a belief that local anarchists had smuggled the knives Alia had used into the Colorado State Penitentiary. Following Alia's first escape attempt, the Italian Consul, Baron Gustavo Tosti, was interviewed. The Baron expressed a belief that Alia's behavior proved him to be mentally deranged. Even so, the Baron declared, "I have no intention of appealing to the Italian Government or of trying to make this an international affair. It is purely a local case."

Despite the Franciscan Order's pleas, Giuseppe Alia was hanged on July 15, 1908, at the Colorado State Penitentiary in Cañon City. The Washington Herald reported Alia's execution as follows:

He went to the gallows fighting, biting, and snarling. The night noises of the penitentiary had died away when Warden Cleghorn summoned the murderer from his cell, and through an interpreter, told him that the hour of his death had arrived. Alia stood for just a moment glaring at the warden and the attendants. Then he raised his head, uttered a string of oaths, and offered his best physical resistance to accompanying the guards to the gallows. The murderer was held by the warden's assistants until he had exhausted himself; then, he was supported to the trap, where the noose was adjusted, and he was hanged.

Legacy
After a Solemn High Mass of Requiem in Denver, Heinrichs' body was transported by rail to St. Bonaventure Monastery in Paterson, New Jersey. Thousands of people attended the wake and mass. He was buried in Totowa, New Jersey's Holy Sepulchre Roman Catholic Cemetery.

Alia admitted that he has been in Chicago, St. Louis, and other eastern cities but disclaimed any knowledge or connection with anarchists in any of these cities. No anarchist literature was found in his room. He gave different explanations for the attack. Michele Presutto notes that the murder occurred at a time of anti-anarchism and anti-Italian prejudice. Presutto attributes Alia's anti-clericalism to a rivalry between the Catholic and Waldensian churches in Sicily. In the wake of the widely reported murder of Heinrichs and the attempted assassination of Chicago Chief of Police George M. Shippy, there was a crackdown on anarchists, with police departments in larger cities seeking to identify and restrain them. Secretary of Commerce and Labor Oscar Straus ordered immigration inspectors to work closely with local police and the United States Secret Service to find, arrest and deport immigrants with Anarchist political beliefs under the terms of the Anarchist Exclusion Act.

Heinrichs's cause for beatification was opened in 1938, and his grave continues to be visited by pilgrims.

Ten years after Heinrichs' death, a Franciscan school in his former posting of Croghan was named the Father Leo Memorial School. (The school having closed, the building is now the American Maple Museum.)

In his native city of Erkelenz, there is a street named for Leo Heinrichs.

References

External links
 
 Commemorative page of Fr. Leo Heinrichs (with photos of him, his tomb, and the church where he was shot)
 "PRIEST SHOT DEAD AT COMMUNION RAIL; Anarchist Glories in Crime", New York Times, February 24, 1908
 "Trial of Priest's Slayer: Alia, who shot Father Leo of Denver, will be in court today. New York Times, March 9, 1908.
 "Father Leo's slayer guilty", New York Times, March 13, 1908
 "ALIA SLASHES GUARD, ATTEMPTS ESCAPE", New York Times, March 15, 1908.
 "ALIA FELLS HIS GUARD.; Slayer of Father Leo Makes His Second Attempt at Escape." New York Times, June 14, 1908.
 Memorial Booklet for Father Leo Heinrichs, Digital Collections, Denver Public Library
 Luigi Botta, Un calzolaio sul patibolo (Giuseppe Alia), "America Oggi", 30 marzo 2016

 Michele Presutto, "Senza timore di Dio. La storia di Giuseppe Alia" , "ASEI-Archivio Storico dell'Emigrazione Italiana", marzo 2018, n.16, pp. 27–40;

1867 births
1908 deaths
19th-century German Roman Catholic priests
20th-century Roman Catholic martyrs
American Servants of God
Antitheism
Anarchism in the United States
Atheism and violence
Deaths by firearm in Colorado
German emigrants to the United States
German Friars Minor
German people murdered abroad
German murder victims
German terrorism victims
People from Erkelenz
Religion and atheism
Terrorist incidents in the United States
Victims of religiously motivated violence in the United States
Violence against Christians
Terrorist incidents in the 1900s